CIAE may refer to:

Central Institute of Agricultural Engineering, Bhopal
China Institute of Atomic Energy
 Centre Interarmées des Actions sur l’Environnement, see